Brian Meyer (born 1973) is an American lawyer and politician from the state of Iowa. A member of the Democratic Party, Meyer serves in the Iowa House of Representatives, representing the 29th district. He previously served on the Des Moines, Iowa City Council.

Early career
Meyer was born in Dubuque, Iowa. He graduated from Dubuque Senior High School, the University of Northern Iowa and Drake University Law School. He served in the Iowa National Guard.

He served as an assistant Iowa attorney general and assistant Polk County attorney. He was elected to the Des Moines City Council in 2007.

Iowa House of Representatives
Meyer ran in a special election for the 33rd district in the Iowa House of Representatives. He defeated the Republican Party candidate, Michael Young, in the election on October 22, 2013. He succeeded Kevin McCarthy, who resigned the seat in the Iowa House to work for the Attorney General of Iowa. He was sworn in on November 1.

Personal life 
In 1998, Meyer married Ann Rossmiller. They have two children.

References

External links
 Brian Meyer at Iowa Legislature
 
 Biography at Ballotpedia

1973 births
Living people
University of Northern Iowa alumni
Iowa lawyers
Politicians from Des Moines, Iowa
Iowa city council members
Democratic Party members of the Iowa House of Representatives
21st-century American politicians
Drake University Law School alumni